According to John Henry Merryman, "The Decisory Oath worked in the following way: Party A could put Party B on his oath as to a fact at issue that was within Party B's knowledge. If Party B refused to swear, the fact was taken as conclusively proved against him. If Party B swore, the fact was taken as conclusively proved in his favor." Mary Gregor explains that this procedure was "designed to protect the judge from threats from the wealthy and the powerful."

Notes

Civil law legal terminology
Judicial legal terminology
Oaths